The following is a list of Russo-Finnish wars.

References

Wars involving Finland
Wars involving Russia
Finland–Russia military relations